CKAG-FM is a French-language First Nations community radio station that operates at 100.1 FM in Pikogan, Quebec, Canada.

Owned by Société de communication Ikito Pikogan, the station received CRTC approval in 1992.

References

External links
CKAG FM
 

Kag